Chester is an EP by the indie folk musician Josh Rouse and Lambchop member Kurt Wagner. It was recorded and engineered by David Henry at True Tone Studios in Nashville, Tennessee and released in September 1999 by Slow River Records. Wagner wrote song lyrics for the album while Rouse composed the music.

Track listing

Personnel  
 Josh Rouse - vocals, guitar, melodica, composer
 Kurt Wagner - vibes, additional ambient noise, artwork, composer, vibraphone
 Sharon Gilchrist - upright bass
 Malcolm Travis - drums
 David Henry - cello, background vocals, sound engineer
 Dennis Cronin - trumpet
 Curt Perkins - Rhodes piano

References 

Josh Rouse albums
1999 EPs